State Highway 48 (SH 48), also known as Bruce Road, is one of New Zealand's shortest state highways. It provides access to Whakapapa Skifield on the slopes of Mount Ruapehu.

Route
It climbs rapidly, following the route of the young Whakapapa River, a tributary of the Whanganui. The highway terminates in Whakapapa Village at the visitors centre near the intersection of Rehua Place, from where an unclassified road winds the further 6 kilometres up the slopes to the skifield.

See also
List of New Zealand state highways

References

External links
 New Zealand Transport Agency

48
Ruapehu District
Transport in Manawatū-Whanganui